Aydın Polatçı (born 15 May 1977) is a Turkish wrestler. He was born in Istanbul. He was Olympic bronze medalist in Freestyle wrestling in 2004. He also competed at the 2000 and 2008 Olympics.

Wrestling career
Aydın Polatçı grew up in his birthplace and took up wrestling there in 1993, having previously competed in the Turkish national sport of oil wrestling. He became a heavyweight at 1.90 metres tall and around 125 kg in body weight. After his first successes at junior level, he became a member of the Aski Ankara wrestling club, where Mehmet Polatçı became his coach. Aydın Polatçı preferred the free style throughout his career. He only competed in the Greco-Roman style twice at military world championships.

He made his first international start in 1995 at the European Junior Championships in Witten, where he took first place in the heavyweight age group (up to the age of 18) in the free style ahead of Tamás Ábrahám from Hungary and Oleg Khorpiakov from Russia.

In 1997 he wrestled in several international championships at junior level, but also already at senior level. At the World Military Championships that year he came second in the heavyweight Greco-Roman style behind Alexei Kolesnikov of Russia and third in the free style behind David Musulbes of Russia and Alireza Rezaei of Iran. At the 1997 European Junior Championships in Istanbul and at the 1997 World Junior Championships in Helsinki, he took first place in both events. In Istanbul he won ahead of Artjom Achigev from Russia and Alex Modebadze from Georgia and in Helsinki ahead of Alexis Rodríguez from Cuba and Artjom Achigev. After the retirement of the 1996 Olympic champion Mahmut Demir, he was also entered in the 1997 European Senior Championships in Warsaw. However, he narrowly missed out on a medal there. Turkey used Zekeriya Güçlü at the 1997 World Championships.

In 1998 he became European champion in Bratislava, defeating in turn David Musulbes, Krassimir Kochev of Bulgaria, Sven Thiele and Milan Mazáč of Slovakia. At the 1998 World Championships in Tehran, he lost his first fight against Andrey Shumilin from Russia. After four victorious bouts, he then lost to Kerry McCoy of the USA in the fight for the bronze medal.

In 1999 Aydın Polatçı lost again to Andrei Shumilin (3:4) at the European Championships in Minsk after four victories in the final. At the 1999 World Championships in Ankara, his home country, he lost on points (6:10 techn. points) in his third fight against the unknown US American Stephen Neal, who went on to become world champion. According to the rules in force at the time, he had to be eliminated and only finished in 5th place.

In 2000, he only competed at the Olympic Games in Sydney. He won his first fight there against Zsolt Gombos from Hungary, but then lost to the later silver medallist Artur Taymazov from Uzbekistan, which meant his elimination.

At the 2001 World Championships in Sofia, Aydın Polatçı finished in fifth place after losing his third fight to David Musulbes. At the 2002 World Championships in Tehran, he won a bronze medal. After losing to David MusuLbes in the semi-finals, he defeated the Georgian Davit Otiashvili.

In 2004, Aydın Polatçı won his second senior international title at the European Championships in Ankara. It beat Boschidar Boyadzhiev from Bulgaria, Zoltán Farkas from Hungary, Radosław Jankowski from Poland, Sven Thiele and Kuramagomed Kuramagomedov from Russia. At the 2004 Olympic Games in Athens, after victories over Rareș Daniel Chintojan of Romania, Sven Thiele and Alexis Rodríguez Valera, he met Artur Taymazov, against whom he again lost on points. In the fight for the Olympic bronze medal he defeated Marid Mutalimov from Kazakhstan. This bronze medal remained the only Olympic medal of his career.

After winning the 2005 Mediterranean Games in Almería, he competed at the World Championships in Budapest that year. There he then managed to win the title at a World Championship for the first time with victories over Tolly Thompson from the United States, Rareș Daniel Chintojan, Kurmagomed Kuramagomedov and Alexis Rodríguez.

References

External links 
 

1977 births
Living people
Sportspeople from Istanbul
Olympic wrestlers of Turkey
Wrestlers at the 2000 Summer Olympics
Turkish male sport wrestlers
Wrestlers at the 2004 Summer Olympics
Wrestlers at the 2008 Summer Olympics
Olympic bronze medalists for Turkey
Olympic medalists in wrestling
Medalists at the 2004 Summer Olympics
Mediterranean Games gold medalists for Turkey
Mediterranean Games medalists in wrestling
Competitors at the 2005 Mediterranean Games
21st-century Turkish people